The buzzing tree frog (Litoria electrica) is a species of frog in the subfamily Pelodryadinae. It is endemic to Australia. Its natural habitats are temperate forests, subtropical or tropical swamps, swamps, intermittent freshwater lakes, intermittent freshwater marshes, and urban areas.

References

Litoria
Amphibians of Queensland
Taxonomy articles created by Polbot
Amphibians described in 1990
Frogs of Australia